Ramón Garbey (born March 31, 1971) is a heavyweight boxer from Cuba, who won the world title as an amateur in light heavyweight division (– 81 kg) at the 1993 World Amateur Boxing Championships in Tampere, Finland. In the final he defeated Nigeria's Jacklord Jacobs. Prior to that Garbey captured the gold medal at the 1991 Pan American Games in the middleweight division (– 75 kg).

Amateur Highlights 
1989 Won the World Junior Amateur Championships in San Juan, Puerto Rico at Middleweight
1991 1st place at Middleweight at Pan-American Games in Havana Cuba. Results were:
Defeated Lincoln Carter (Jamaica) TKO 1
Defeated Ricardo Santiago (Puerto Rico) TKO 1
Defeated Chris Johnson (Canada) TKO 2
1991 3rd place at Middleweight at World Championships in Sydney, Australia. Results were:
Defeated Chris Byrd (United States) points
Defeated Dennis Galvin (Ireland) TKO 3
Defeated Justin Crawford (Australia) TKO 3
Lost to Alexander Lebziak (Soviet Union) points
1992 defeated Sven Ottke by TKO 3, in AIBA tournament held in Berlin, Germany
1993 Light Heavyweight World Champion at competition in Tampere, Finland. Results were:
Defeated Mkhitar Vanessian (Armenia) TKO 1
Defeated Dimitri Vybornov (Russia) points
Defeated Wojciech Bartnik (Poland) points
Defeated Dale Brown (Canada) points, later scored a 4th round TKO over Brown in 1994 in Dublin, Ireland.
Defeated Jacklord Jacobs (Nigeria) points

Pro career
Nicknamed "El Nino" he made his professional debut on September 20, 1996 in Miami, Florida.

Professional boxing record

|-
|align="center" colspan=8|19 Wins (13 knockouts, 6 decisions), 4 Losses (0 knockouts, 4 decisions) 
|-
| align="center" style="border-style: none none solid solid; background: #e3e3e3"|Result
| align="center" style="border-style: none none solid solid; background: #e3e3e3"|Record
| align="center" style="border-style: none none solid solid; background: #e3e3e3"|Opponent
| align="center" style="border-style: none none solid solid; background: #e3e3e3"|Type
| align="center" style="border-style: none none solid solid; background: #e3e3e3"|Round
| align="center" style="border-style: none none solid solid; background: #e3e3e3"|Date
| align="center" style="border-style: none none solid solid; background: #e3e3e3"|Location
| align="center" style="border-style: none none solid solid; background: #e3e3e3"|Notes
|-align=center
|Win
|
|align=left| Mike Sheppard
|UD
|4
|
|align=left| Fort Lauderdale, Florida, United States
|align=left|
|-
|Win
|
|align=left| James "Baby Tyson" Brock
|UD
|6
|28 Oct 2006
|align=left| Palm Beach, Florida, United States
|align=left|
|-
|Loss
|
|align=left| Kendrick "The Apostle" Releford
|UD
|10
|8 Jun 2004
|align=left| Hollywood, Florida, United States
|align=left|
|-
|Win
|
|align=left| Jermell "The Truth" Barnes
|UD
|12
|17 Jan 2004
|align=left| Coconut Creek, Florida, United States
|align=left|
|-
|Win
|
|align=left| Saul "La Cobra" Montana
|TKO
|8
|3 Nov 2001
|align=left| Miami, Florida, United States
|align=left|
|-
|Win
|
|align=left| Ezra Sellers
|TKO
|1
|17 May 2001
|align=left| Biloxi, Mississippi, United States
|align=left|
|-
|Loss
|
|align=left| Fres "The Big O" Oquendo
|UD
|10
|25 Jun 2000
|align=left| Elgin, Illinois, United States
|align=left|
|-
|Loss
|
|align=left| James "Lights Out" Toney
|UD
|10
|8 Oct 1999
|align=left| Taunton, Massachusetts, United States
|align=left|
|-
|Loss
|
|align=left| Napoleon Tagoe
|MD
|10
|4 Jul 1999
|align=left| Fort Lauderdale, Florida, United States
|align=left|
|-
|Win
|
|align=left| John "Yahya" McClain
|UD
|10
|18 Apr 1999
|align=left| Miami, Florida, United States
|align=left|
|-
|Win
|
|align=left| Leeonzer Barber
|TKO
|9
|9 Jan 1999
|align=left| Las Vegas, Nevada, United States
|align=left|
|-
|Win
|
|align=left| Cliff Nellon
|TKO
|2
|13 Nov 1998
|align=left| Miami, Florida, United States
|align=left|
|-
|Win
|
|align=left| Onebo Maxime
|TKO
|7
|21 Jul 1998
|align=left| Atlantic City, New Jersey, United States
|align=left|
|-
|Win
|
|align=left| Art Bayliss
|PTS
|4
|30 May 1998
|align=left| Atlantic City, New Jersey, United States
|align=left|
|-
|Win
|
|align=left| Willie "Punching Preacher" Driver
|KO
|1
|23 Jan 1998
|align=left| Lake Worth, Florida, United States
|align=left|
|-
|Win
|
|align=left| Scottie Chestnut
|KO
|1
|4 Nov 1997
|align=left| Tunica, Mississippi, United States
|align=left|
|-
|Win
|
|align=left| Roy "House of" Payne
|KO
|1
|3 Oct 1997
|align=left| Atlantic City, New Jersey, United States
|align=left|
|-
|Win
|
|align=left| Travis Evans
|KO
|1
|20 Jun 1997
|align=left| Atlantic City, New Jersey, United States
|align=left|
|-
|Win
|
|align=left| Anthony Wade
|TKO
|1
|26 Apr 1997
|align=left| Atlantic City, New Jersey, United States
|align=left|
|-
|Win
|
|align=left| Sedreck "Big Buck" Fields
|UD
|4
|5 Apr 1997
|align=left| Atlantic City, New Jersey, United States
|align=left|
|-
|Win
|
|align=left| Anthony Harris
|TKO
|1
|6 Dec 1996
|align=left| Atlantic City, New Jersey, United States
|align=left|
|-
|Win
|
|align=left| Tony Torres
|TKO
|1
|1 Nov 1996
|align=left| Coconut Creek, Florida, United States
|align=left|
|-
|Win
|
|align=left| Kerry Parks
|TKO
|2
|20 Sep 1996
|align=left| Miami, Florida, United States
|align=left|
|}

External links
 

1971 births
Living people
Light-heavyweight boxers
Boxers at the 1991 Pan American Games
Cuban male boxers
AIBA World Boxing Championships medalists
Pan American Games gold medalists for Cuba
Pan American Games medalists in boxing
Medalists at the 1991 Pan American Games